Artan Sakaj (born 8 December 1980) is an Albanian football manager and retired player.

Playing career

Club
Sakaj began his playing career with his home town club, KS Flamurtari Vlorë, before moving to clubs outside of Vlorë, including KS Elbasani. He joined Besa in June 2008, appearing for the club in the UEFA Intertoto Cup 2008 as they advanced to the second round before losing to Grasshopper Club Zürich. In summer 2009 Sakaj returned to Flamurtari, where he is captain of the team.

References

External links
 Profile – FSHF

1980 births
Living people
Footballers from Vlorë
Albanian footballers
Association football defenders
Flamurtari Vlorë players
KF Teuta Durrës players
KF Elbasani players
Besa Kavajë players
Kategoria Superiore players
Albanian football managers